Gaya was a Korean confederacy of territorial polities in the Nakdong River basin of southern Korea, growing out of the Byeonhan confederacy of the Samhan period.

The traditional period used by historians for Gaya chronology is AD 42–532. According to archaeological evidence in the third and fourth centuries some of the city-states of Byeonhan evolved into the Gaya confederacy, which was later annexed by Silla, one of the Three Kingdoms of Korea. The individual polities that made up the Gaya confederacy have been characterized as small city-states. The material culture remains of Gaya culture mainly consist of burials and their contents of mortuary goods that have been excavated by archaeologists. Archaeologists interpret mounded burial cemeteries of the late third and early fourth centuries such as Daeseong-dong in Gimhae and Bokcheon-dong in Busan as the royal burial grounds of Gaya polities.

Names

Although most commonly referred to as Gaya (가야; 加耶, 伽耶, 伽倻), probably due to the imprecision of transcribing Korean words into hanja, historical sources use a variety of names, including Garak (가락; 駕洛, 迦落), Gara (가라; 加羅, 伽羅, 迦羅, 柯羅), Garyang (가량;加良), and Guya (구야; 狗耶). According to Christopher I. Beckwith, "The spelling Kaya is the modern Korean reading of the characters used to write the name; the pronunciation /kara/ (transcriptionally *kala) is certain."

In Japanese, Gaya is referred to as Mimana (任那), a name with considerable political connotations. However, a word kara (から, 韓 'Korea', 唐 '[Tang] China', 漢 '[Han] China'), which is probably from the name of Gaya on the Korean Peninsula of antiquity, has been preserved in Japanese with the sense "China or Korea, mainland East Asia" and, more recently, an even more vague sense of "the nations overseas, foreign country."

Languages 
Linguists, including Vovin and Janhunen, suggest that Japonic languages were spoken in large parts of the southern Korean Peninsula. According to Vovin, these "Peninsular Japonic languages" were replaced by Koreanic-speakers (possibly belonging to the Han-branch).

The later Gaya language likely belonged to the Koreanic Han languages.

The genetic diversity in the Gaya Kingdom region is linked to Jomon-related ancestry.

History
According to a legend written in the Samguk Yusa in the 13th century, six eggs descended from heaven in the year AD 42 with a message that they would be kings. Six boys were born and matured within 12 days. One of them, named Suro, became the king of Geumgwan Gaya, and the other five founded the remaining five Gayas: Daegaya, Seongsan Gaya, Ara Gaya, Goryeong Gaya, and Sogaya.

The Gaya polities evolved out of the chiefly political structures of the twelve tribes of the ancient Byeonhan confederacy, one of the Samhan confederacies. The loosely organized chiefdoms resolved into six Gaya groups, centered on Geumgwan Gaya. Based on archaeological sources and the limited written records, scholars have identified the late 3rd century as a period of transition from Byeonhan to Gaya, noting increasing military activity and changing funerary customs. This transition was also associated with the replacement of the previous elite in some principalities (including Daegaya) by elements from the Buyeo kingdom, which brought a more militaristic ideology and style of rule.

After the Eight Port Kingdoms War(浦上八國 亂)(209~212) between Silla and Gaya, Gaya was influenced by Silla's southeast peninsular hegemony, but diplomatically utilized the influence of Japan and Baekje to maintain independence. The Gaya Confederacy disintegrated under pressure from Goguryeo between 391 and 412, although the last Gaya polities remained independent until they were conquered by Silla in 562, as punishment for assisting Baekje in a war against Silla.

In 529, Silla destroyed Takgitan Gaya(啄己呑國) under the pretext of its alliance with Daegaya and took half of Taksun Gaya(卓淳國)'s territory. This led Daegaya to distrust the Gaya and begin uniting around the Ara Gaya, which was maintaining a strong power. In order to escape interference between Baekje and Silla in Gaya, the Ara Gaya invited Silla, Baekje, and Japan to hold the Anra Conference(安羅會議). Although they wanted to pressure Silla through the meeting to rebuild the Takgitan Gaya(啄己呑國) and raise the international status of Anra, Baekje preferred strong diplomacy and Silla was not interested in it. Although Japan was pro-Anra Gaya, it was unable to help due to internal problems.

In 541 and 544, Baekje led the Sabi Conferences(泗沘會議), which were participated in by seven countries including Ara and Imna. However, Ara still did not fully trust in Baekje. As a result of the conference, Gaya attacked Goguryeo alongside the Silla-Baekje alliance and acquired Seoul. In this attack, Baekje was betrayed by Silla and Gaya was also absorbed by Silla.

Economy
Polities were situated in the alluvial flats of tributary river valleys and the mouth of the Nakdong. In particular, the mouth of the Nakdong has fertile plains, direct access to the sea, and rich iron deposits. Gaya polities had economies that were based on agriculture, fishing, casting, and long-distance trade. They were particularly known for its iron-working, as Byeonhan had been before it. Gaya polities exported abundant quantities of iron ore, iron armor, and other weaponry to Baekje and the Kingdom of Wa. In contrast to the largely commercial and non-political ties of Byeonhan, Gaya polities seem to have attempted to maintain strong political ties with those kingdoms as well.

Politics
Several ancient historical records list a number of polities of Gaya. For example, Goryeo Saryak (고려사략; 高麗史略) lists five: Geumgwan Gaya, Goryeong Gaya, Bihwa Gaya, Ara Gaya, and Seongsan Gaya.

Traditionally, the Gaya Confederacy enjoyed good relations with Japan and Baekje, such as when the three states allied against Goguryeo and Silla in the Goguryeo-Wa War. Records indicate Gaya would alongside Baekje regularly send economical, cultural, and technological aid to Japan in exchange for military and political aid, as the Yamato court desired technological progress and cultural advancement while Baekje and the Gaya states desired Japan's military aid in their wars against Silla and Goguryeo. 

The various Gaya polities formed a confederacy in the 2nd and 3rd centuries that was centered on the heartland of Geumgwan Gaya in modern Gimhae. After a period of decline, the confederacy was revived around the turn of the 5th and 6th centuries, this time centered on Daegaya of modern Goryeong. However, it was unable to defend itself against the incursions and attacks of the neighboring kingdom of Silla. Eventually, all of the Gaya Confederacy were absorbed into Silla.

After the fall of the Gaya Confederacy, many of the nobility and elite of the confederated states were integrated into the ranks of Silla's bone-rank system including the royal houses of the defeated Gaya Confederacy. One such example was the Sillan General Gim Yu-sin who played a critical role in the unification of the Three Kingdoms of Korea. Gim was the great-grandchild of King Guhae of Geumgwan Gaya, the last ruler of the Geumgwan Gaya state. As a result, Gim was given the rank of "true bone" which was the second highest rank one could attain, in part because the royal family of Geungwan Gaya, the Gimhae Kim clan were intermarried with the Gyeongju Kim clan, which was a prominent noble house in Silla.

Member statelets
 Geumgwan Gaya/Garak state
 Daegaya/Banpa state
 Sogaya/Goja state
 Ara Gaya/Alla state
 Seongsan Gaya/Byeokjin state
 Goryeong Gaya
 Bihwa Gaya/Biji state, occasionally classified as the member of Jinhan confederacy.

Mimana/Imna controversy

Political and trade relations with Japan have been a source of nationalist controversy in both Korea and Japan. Japanese publicists during the twentieth century looked to the Nihon Shoki, which claims that Gaya (named "Mimana" also "Kara" in Japanese) was a military outpost of Japan during the Yamato period (300–710). While there is no evidence to support this, the claim has nonetheless been advocated at various times by Japanese imperialists, nationalists and press to justify the Japanese colonial rule of Korea between 19th and 20th centuries.

Archaeological evidence suggests that Gaya polities were the main exporter of technology and culture to Kyushu at that time. The theory of a Japanese outpost is widely rejected in Korea and Japan as there was no Japanese local groups at the time that had a strong enough military power to conquer Gaya or any other part of Korea. The technology of Gaya was more advanced than that of the Japanese dynasties of the time.

Though this theory has been largely refuted since the 1970s, it remains a sensitive and re-occurring issue in modern-day.

In 2010, a joint study group of historians sponsored by the governments of Japan and South Korea agreed that Gaya had never been militarily colonized by ancient Japan.

Gallery

See also
History of Korea
List of Korean monarchs#Gaya confederacy
Three Kingdoms of Korea
Crown of Gaya
Relations between Kaya and ancient Japan

References

External links

Doopedia, Doosan Encyclopedia

 
562 disestablishments
States and territories established in the 40s
States and territories disestablished in the 560s
Former countries in East Asia
Former countries in Korean history
40s establishments
Former monarchies of East Asia